Amina Wali is a Pakistani alpine skier. She remained national champion for 15 years. She is nominated as goodwill ambassador to Plan International organization for supporting its campaign "because I am a girl".

Family and background
Amina Wali belongs to former Royal Family of Punial, Ghizer. She is daughter of ski instructor and mountaineer Col (R) Raja Amjad Wali. She was born in 1993 in Abbottabad.

She started skiing at an age of 4. She is the first woman (along with her sister) to win an international medal in skiing for Pakistan. She remained National Champion for 15 years. 

She hails from Ghizer district of Gilgit-Baltistan. She has been awarded with National High Achiever Award. 

She is married and has three children. She is presently working with UNICEF as an environmentalist. She is Gold medalist of BS and M Phill Environmental Sciences.

Career

1997
Amina learned to ski in a remote area of Rattu, Astore District of Gilgit-Baltistan. Since then she is indulged with the sport, primarily for fun and then as a semi-profession.

2004
In 2004, she appeared in National Skiing Championship known as 'Saadia Khan National Ski Cup' for the first time.

2005–2015
In 2005 Amina grabbed her first gold medal in giant slalom and a bronze medal in slalom of the National Ski Championship held at Malam Jabba of Khyber Pakhtunkhwa. Since then she is winning medals in the National Championships.

2011
Wali placed second in both giant slalom and slalom events at the 2011 South Asian Winter Games held in India from 10 to 16 January 2011.

2013

Wali competed in the International Ski Federation (FIS) races in Erzurum, she finnished 16th in the Slalom event and eliminated her chance to compete at Sochi Olympics.

References

Year of birth missing (living people)
Living people
Pakistani female alpine skiers
South Asian Winter Games silver medalists for Pakistan
South Asian Winter Games medalists in alpine skiing